is the 8th studio album by Cute. It was released on September 4, 2013 in 3 editions: regular edition and 2 limited editions.

Track listing

CD
"Bagel ni Ham & Cheese" (ベーグルにハム＆チーズ; "Ham & Cheese Bagel")
"Namida mo Denai Kanashiku mo Nai Nan ni mo Shitakunai" (涙も出ない 悲しくもない なんにもしたくない; "I'm Not Crying, I'm Not Sad, I Don't Want to Do Anything")
"Kanashiki Amefuri" (悲しき雨降り; "Sad Rainfall")
"Tadori Tsuita Onna Senshi" (たどり着いた女戦士; "Struggling Female Warriors")
"Crazy Kanzen na Otona" (Crazy 完全な大人; "A Crazy, Perfect Adult")
"Nichiyōbi wa Daisuki yo" (日曜日は大好きよ; "I Love Sundays")
"Abiru Hodo Ai o Kudasai" (浴びる程の愛をください)
"Aitai Aitai Aitai na" (会いたい 会いたい 会いたいな; "I Want, I Want, I Want to Meet You")
"Adam to Eve no Dilemma" (アダムとイブのジレンマ; "Adam and Eve's Dilemma")
"Watashi ga Honki o Dasu Yoru" (私が本気を出す夜; "The Night I Went All Out")
"Kono Machi" (この街; "This Town")

Limited Edition A DVD
 Excerpt from Cute Concert Tour 2013 Haru ~Treasure Box~

Limited Edition B DVD
"Bagel ni Ham & Cheese" (Music Video)
"Crazy Kanzen na Otona" (Crazy Dance Ver.)
Album making-of and commentary

Featured members
Maimi Yajima
Saki Nakajima
Airi Suzuki
Chisato Okai
Mai Hagiwara

Song information
"Bagel ni Ham & Cheese"
Lyrics & composition: Tsunku
Arrangement: Shoichiro Hirata
Center vocal: Airi Suzuki
"Namida mo Denai Kanashiku mo Nai Nan ni mo Shitakunai"
Lyrics & composition: Tsunku
Arrangement: AKIRA
Center vocal: Mai Hagiwara
"Kanashiki Amefuri"
"Tadori Tsuita Onna Senshi"
Lyrics & composition: Tsunku
Arrangement: Kaoru Okubo
"Crazy Kanzen na Otona"
"Nichiyōbi wa Daisuki yo"
Lyrics & composition: Tsunku
Arrangement: Keiichi Kondo
Center vocal: Maimi Yajima
"Abiru Hodo Ai o Kudasai"
Lyrics & composition: Tsunku
Arrangement: Jun Yamazaki
Center vocal: Chisato Okai
"Aitai Aitai Aitai na"
"Adam to Eve no Dilemma"
"Watashi ga Honki o Dasu Yoru"
Lyrics & composition: Tsunku
Arrangement: Masanori Takumi
Center vocal: Saki Nakajima
"Kono Machi"

Charts

References

External links
Discography: Hello! Project

Cute (Japanese idol group) albums
2013 albums
Zetima albums
Albums produced by Tsunku
Japanese-language albums